Brandon Christopher Sanders (born June 10, 1973) is a former American football player for the New York Giants in the National Football League (NFL). The defensive back played three season for the Giants, from 1997 to 1999. He went to college at the University of Arizona and high school at Helix High School.

References

External links
Just Sports Stats

1973 births
Living people
American football defensive backs
Arizona Wildcats football players
New York Giants players
Las Vegas Outlaws (XFL) players
Amsterdam Admirals players
Players of American football from San Diego